Nagial is a village in the Mirpur Tehsil of Mirpur District of Azad Kashmir, Pakistan. Nagial cast is prominent  in district Jhelum.   Poverty has been an issue of the village

Demography
According to the 1998 census of Pakistan, its population was 741.

History

Like in many villages in the Mirpur region, many villagers have emigrated to the United Kingdom. The village gets its name from the Nagyal tribe of Jats, who form the bulk of the population.

References

Populated places in Mirpur District